Hollis Vernon Gentry III (born December 3, 1954 in Corpus Christi (Texas), † September 5, 2006 in San Diego) was an American saxophonist, music producer and composer of smooth jazz and Latin jazz.

Gentry grew up in San Diego and founded the funk band Power at the age of fifteen. Power opened for Cannonball Adderley in 1972 when Gentry was at college. He next played with Bruce Cameron. In 1980 he earned a master's degree in music from the University of California, San Diego. He was known in the mid-1980s in San Diego and southern California as a founding member of the smooth jazz formation Fattburger, with whom he recorded several albums. He also worked with Joe Sample, Stanley Clarke, Nathan East, Larry Carlton, Nancy Wilson, Barry White, Freddie Hubbard, Al Jarreau, Thelma Houston, Randy Crawford, Alphonse Mouzon, Gaea Schell, Rob Mullins and David Benoit. Under his own name, he released the albums Hollis Gentry's Neon and For the Record.

He was one of the founders of the music company NETunes, where he was Senior Vice President and A & R for Latin Jazz, World-Beat and Reggae Music. Gentry suffered a serious car accident in 2004; he died at the beginning of September 2006 at the age of 51.

References

External links
 Hollis Gentry, III interview on In Black America, September 1, 1989 at the American Archive of Public Broadcasting

1954 births
2006 deaths